The West Berkeley Shellmound, located in West Berkeley, California, sits at the site of the earliest known habitation in the San Francisco Bay Area. The shellmound (also often referred to as a midden) was used for both burials and ceremonial purposes, and was a repository for shells, ritual objects, and ceremonial items. Recent proposals for development on the site were stalled for years by the City of Berkeley and local Indigenous activists and organizations, most notably Corrina Gould. The California Court of Appeal found on April 20, 2021 that these delays were legally unjustifiable and that there was no evidence of a historic structure that would be disturbed by the development and that the project could proceed.

History 
The shellmound sits within the territory of the Chochenyo people, a division of the indigenous Ohlone people. Carbon dating puts the earliest additions to the shellmound at about 3,700 B.C.E, with continuous additions from a village at the site until 800 C.E. At that point, the village relocated nearby, but the mound maintained ongoing ceremonial purposes, including as a burial site. While the portions of the mound that were aboveground, reportedly 300 feet long and thirty feet high, were removed by white inhabitants between the years of 1853 and 1910 and used to build roads and for other commercial purposes.

There are no remaining portions of the village, but a parking lot located at 1900 Fourth Street is within the three-block landmarked area and was proposed for a park and memorial center. In 2000 the Berkeley City Council named the three-block area an historic landmark,  and in September, 2020, a private advocacy group called "The National Trust for Historic Preservation" declared the site as one of the 11 “most endangered historic places” in the United States .

The discovery of two sets of ancient human remains situated outside of the previously-established boundaries of the shellmound during construction at 1919 Fourth Street has prompted calls to re-designate the borders of the shellmound.

Protection efforts 
A developer with plans to build a mixed-use 260-unit apartment complex with 130 of those units designated as low-income housing under Senate Bill 35 was delayed from 2018 to 2021 by the City of Berkeley, motivated in part by the activism of local activists who intervened in the lawsuit including Corrina Gould, a local Lisjan Ohlone leader and activist, and organizations including the Coalition to Save the West Berkeley Shellmound and Indian People Organizing for Change (IPOC). On April 20, 2021, a three-justice panel of the California Court of Appeal unanimously declared in a 70-page opinion that after almost 20 years of investigation and years of litigation, "[t]here is no evidence in the record that the Shellmound is now present on the project site in a state that could reasonably be viewed as an existing structure, nor even remnants recognizable as part of a structure." The Court therefore held that "[t]here is no evidence in the record of a structure that could be demolished by appellant’s project." Although there were numerous allegations that the parking lot was a burial place, there was no evidence of that.

The City of Berkeley and the Confederated Villages of Lisjan sought review from the California Supreme Court of the order allowing the development to proceed, but only one, rather than the required four, Justices considered the case appropriate for further review and the appellate decision allowing the development to proceed became law.

References 

Geography of the San Francisco Bay Area
Ohlone
History of the San Francisco Bay Area
Geography of Berkeley, California